Christine Nagy is an American radio broadcaster, of Hungarian ancestry. She is a morning radio personality at WLTW-FM (106.7 Lite FM), which is New York City's highest-rated radio station. She is also an actress.

Before working for Lite FM, Nagy was a traffic reporter for Shadow Traffic and then became a member of the Z Morning Zoo on sister station Z100. Nagy reported the news and entertainment topics for over eight years before leaving in December 2005. Nagy reportedly left to dedicate more time to acting and has since done a few independent films and theatrical productions, performing in the  Off-Broadway play, "Tony and Tina's Wedding." In 2021, Nagy appeared opposite BD Wong in the first season of Around the Sun, an episodic audio drama by Brad Forenza.

Nagy returned to the radio airwaves as a news and entertainment reporter in 2005 to New York City's top-rated station, 106.7 LITE-FM (WLTW). (WLTW is a Clear Channel-owned sister station of Z100.) She co-hosts WLTW's weekday morning show with Karen Carson, including local WNYW-TV weatherman, Nick Gregory. Along with her morning show duties, she tapes interviews in the half-hour community program titled Get Connected. The show airs Sunday mornings at 7 a.m.

Additionally, Christine hosts lifestyle-oriented shows for Martha Stewart Living Radio on Sirius Satellite Radio, located at channel 112. On Wednesdays, she works with Stewart's beauty editor, Elizabeth Graves, interviewing guests for lifestyle topics.

Nagy had her own dating-themed show at Caroline's comedy club called "Hookin' Up with Christine Nagy" for 2 years. She co-created the show with her brother, Charles a writer and musician. It featured popular comedians.

Nagy lives in New Jersey, the same state as her alma mater, Montclair State University, where she studied broadcasting.

References

External links
ChristineNagy.com Christine's website.
Lite FM Christine on WLTW-FM 

"Christine Nagy Returns to New York City Radio"

American people of Hungarian descent
Montclair State University alumni
Living people
Year of birth missing (living people)
People from New Jersey
Radio personalities from New York City